Eights Week, also known as Summer Eights, is a four-day regatta of bumps races which constitutes the University of Oxford's main intercollegiate rowing event of the year. The regatta takes place in May of each year, from the Wednesday to the Saturday of the fifth week of Trinity Term.  Men's and women's coxed eights compete in separate divisions for their colleges.

Overview

The racing takes place on the Isis, a length of the River Thames, which is generally too narrow for side by side racing. For each division, thirteen boats line up at the downstream end of the stretch, each cox holding onto a rope attached to the bank, leaving around 1.5 boat lengths between each boat. The start of racing is signalled by the firing of a cannon, each crew attempting to progress up their division by bumping the boat in front, while avoiding being bumped by the boat behind. Once a bump has taken place, both of the crews involved stop racing and move to the side to allow the rest of the division to pass. It is possible to "over bump" if the 2 crews in front of your boat bump (and so drop out) and your boat can catch the boat that was in front of them. They then swap places for the next day's racing, whether that be the calendar day or the first day of racing in the next year's competition.

The ultimate aim of a crew is to become "Head of the River" (top of the first division) and stay there. This entitles the winning crew to commission trophy oars in their college colours with the names and weights of the successful crew on them — commonly called "winning blades". As this is only possible for crews already near the top of division one, another way to win blades is to bump on each day of the competition. As the responsibility for awarding blades to crews rests with the individual colleges concerned, there are slight differences in the criteria required.

The "Double Headship" is an accolade awarded to any college finishing with both their men's and women's crews at the "Head of the River" in their respective divisions. A silver "Double Headship Trophy" was commissioned from the silversmith Peter Musson in 2003, to commemorate the historic occasion.

Early history 

Although regular races between professional watermen had been known since 1715 when Doggett's Coat and Badge was instituted, amateur racing was unknown before 1808. The first such race may have been held in Yarmouth in that year.  Meanwhile, recreational rowing had begun in Oxford very much earlier, with students rowing in single wherries at least as early as 1769.

The first amateur races between organised clubs which prepared and trained for the event began in Oxford in 1815. In this year, crews from Brasenose College and Jesus College raced for the Head of the River, from Iffley Lock to Mr King's Barge, which was moored near the current Head of the River hotel. The event is also notable for the fact that both crews rowed in eight oared boats, specially built for the purpose. Such recreational as occurred at this time was usually conducted in pairs, or four or six oared cutters. The fact the racing was conducted in eight oared boats gave rise to the event being known as Eights.

Brasenose College and Jesus College recontested the event in 1816, with Brasenose again triumphing. Christ Church joined in the event from 1817, when they went Head, a position they retained until 1819. Christ Church did not row in 1820. The next recorded races, between Brasenose and Jesus, were in 1821 and 1822. A dispute about professional watermen being allowed in college crews precluded racing in 1823. Until this time, Jesus and Brasenose had each used paid coaches who rowed in the stroke seats of the crews.

From 1824, Christ Church and Exeter College began racing, with Exeter going Head in that year. A rule banning the use of "out college men" (i.e. men from other colleges) rowing in college crews saw the entry of Worcester College in 1825, University and Balliol Colleges in 1827, and Oriel and Trinity Colleges in 1828.

During the Covid-19 pandemic in 2020, Summer Eights were cancelled for the first time since the Second World War. In the year after, Summer Eights were replaced by Summer Torpids, which was held instead because the 2021 Torpids races were also cancelled due to the pandemic response. Both Summer Eights and Torpids resumed as regular in 2023, using the college rankings from the end of 2019.

Head of the River – Summary table (excluding World War 2 races)

Head of the River – Men
Eights Week has been held since 1815.

No racing occurred during World War I.  In World War II, though college rowing continued, there were insufficient students for normal racing between colleges to be maintained.  As a consequence, most colleges competed in composite clubs, and the number of crews competing was greatly curtailed.  After the war, normal racing continued, and in 1946 college crews started in the order in which they finished in 1939.

Head of the River – Women

See also
 May Bumps, the equivalent event in Cambridge
 Torpids, a similar event in Hilary Term

References

External links
Oxford University Rowing Clubs
 Oxford Bumps Charts
 Eights statistics

1815 establishments in England
Recurring sporting events established in 1815
Regattas on the River Thames
Rowing at the University of Oxford
Bumps races
May events
Events in Oxford
Annual events in England
Annual sporting events in the United Kingdom
Christ Church Meadow, Oxford